Hilltop is an unincorporated area and census-designated place (CDP) adjacent to the city of Spartanburg in Spartanburg County, South Carolina, United States. It was first listed as a CDP prior to the 2020 census with a population of 3,273.

The CDP is in central Spartanburg County and is bordered to the southeast by the city of Spartanburg. Interstate 585 forms the northeast border of the CDP, Interstate 85 Business is the northwest border, and the southwest border is a branch of the Norfolk Southern Railway. The CDP of Southern Shops is to the northwest, across I-85 Business, and Saxon is to the southwest, across the railroad.

South Carolina Highway 56 (Asheville Highway) is the main road through Hilltop, leading southeast into Spartanburg and northwest  to Inman.

Demographics

2020 census

Note: the US Census treats Hispanic/Latino as an ethnic category. This table excludes Latinos from the racial categories and assigns them to a separate category. Hispanics/Latinos can be of any race.

References 

Census-designated places in Spartanburg County, South Carolina
Census-designated places in South Carolina